Yanga Sobetwa (born 25 April 2001), is a South African singer-songwriter mononymously known as Yanga. She rose to fame in 2018 subsequent to winning the 14th season of Idols South Africa. 

Her debut studio album Promised Land which peaked at number one on iTunes features her label mate and Idols SA season 13 winner Paxton Fielies, and Amanda Black as well as the Grammy Award-winning Soweto Gospel Choir, it was the first time the winner of the show reached the spot.

The Cape Town singer followed in Fielies' footsteps after winning the event in 2018 as she was nearly the same age as her at the time she won the talent show, Sobetwa had her prize money frozen for a year or so and decided to live off of gig money and sponsors for the time being.

In 2022 Sobetwa received an honorary adult friend award at the World's Children's Prize Ceremony. She forms part of the honorary recipient, with the late former president of South Africa Nelson Mandela and others who became ambassadors for children across the globe.

Awards and nominations

Discography 
 Promised Land (2019)

Filmography

Television

References

External links 
 

Living people
2001 births
South African women musicians
Idols South Africa winners
South African women singer-songwriters